= Arnold Blumberg =

American historian

- Born: 1925
- Died: July 10, 2006 (aged 80–81); Jerusalem

Academic background
- Education: University of Pennsylvania

Arnold Blumberg (1925 – July 10, 2006) was professor of history at Towson State University in Towson, Maryland for 40 years. A scholar of European diplomatic history, he was the author of seven books, and numerous scholarly articles.

== Early life and education ==
He was born in Philadelphia in 1925, and served in the United States Army during World War II. In 1952 he earned his PhD from the University of Pennsylvania. He was a teacher of social studies Philadelphia Public Schools, 1950–1958. Faculty Towson State University, Baltimore, from 1958, professor history, from 1964. Visiting lecturer, library consultant Mohawk Valley Community College, Utica, New York, 1963–1964. In 1995 he was winner of the Towson University President's award for distinguished service to the university.

== Publications ==
- A Manual for Undergraduate Term Papers. (1979)
- History of Congregation Shearith Israel of Baltimore, on the threshold of a century
- Diplomacy of the Mexican Empire, 1863–1867 (1971)
- View from Jerusalem, 1849-–1858: the consular diary of James and Elizabeth Anne Finn
- A Carefully Planned Accident: The Italian War of 1859 (1990)
- Great Leaders, Great Tyrants?: Contemporary Views of World Rulers Who Made History (1995)
- The History of Israel (1998)
- Zion Before Zionism 1838–1880 (2007)

== Awards ==
In 1995 he was winner of the Towson University President's award for distinguished service to the university.
